Nguyễn Phúc Thái (1650–1691) was the ruler of Cochinchina from 1687 to 1691. During his short rule, a small rebellion by Ming Chinese was put down.

Biography
Nguyễn Phúc Thái was also known as Nguyễn Phước Trăn, courtesy name Ngạn. He was the second son of lord Nguyễn Phúc Tần. Nguyễn Phúc Thái took the title Hoằng Quốc-công (National Duke of Hoằng, different from Quận-công as Local Duke). With the end of the Trịnh–Nguyễn War, not much of note happened during Nguyễn Phúc Thái's rule. It is reported that he put down an uprising by Chinese immigrants who had settled in Saigon.

In 1689, he ordered an invasion of Cambodia. However, the Vietnamese general withdrew after meeting with the Cambodian king Chei Chettha III's envoy, a beautiful woman. In 1690 Nguyễn Phúc Thái sent a more famous general, Nguyễn Hữu Hào, who also retreated after meeting the same woman, waiting for presents that never came.

On February 7, 1691, Nguyễn Phúc Thái died and was succeeded by his eldest son, Nguyễn Phúc Chu.

References

 Encyclopedia of Asian History, Volume 3 (Nguyen Lords) 1988. Charles Scribner's Sons, New York. 

1650 births
1691 deaths
Th
17th-century Vietnamese people